Nahomys Acosta Batte (born 15 May 2001) is a Cuban judoka. At the 2019 Pan American Games held in Lima, Peru, she won one of the bronze medals in the women's 52 kg event.

Career 

In 2018, she won one of the bronze medals in the women's 52 kg event at the 2018 Central American and Caribbean Games held in Barranquilla, Colombia. In the same year, she also competed in the girls' 52 kg and mixed team events at the 2018 Summer Youth Olympics held in Buenos Aires, Argentina.

In 2020, she won one of the bronze medals in the women's 52 kg event at the 2020 Pan American Judo Championships held in Guadalajara, Mexico.

Achievements

References

External links 
 

Living people
2001 births
Place of birth missing (living people)
Cuban female judoka
Pan American Games medalists in judo
Pan American Games bronze medalists for Cuba
Medalists at the 2019 Pan American Games
Judoka at the 2019 Pan American Games
Judoka at the 2018 Summer Youth Olympics
Competitors at the 2018 Central American and Caribbean Games
Central American and Caribbean Games gold medalists for Cuba
Central American and Caribbean Games bronze medalists for Cuba
Central American and Caribbean Games medalists in judo
21st-century Cuban women